Gëzim Alpion is an Albanian academic, political analyst, writer, playwright, and civil society activist. He holds a BA from Cairo University and a PhD from Durham University, UK. He is currently based in the Department of Sociology at the University of Birmingham, UK.

Stephen Schwartz holds that Alpion is 'a pioneer in the academic study of the phenomenon of celebrity', and ‘the most authoritative English-language author on Blessed Teresa of Kolkata'. Referring to Alpion's 2007 study Mother Teresa: Saint or Celebrity?, Schwartz contends that 'in its depth, breadth, and seriousness', this book 'may stand for some time to come as the single most important biography of Mother Teresa in English.’ 
In his review of the same book for the American Communication Journal, Marvin Williams holds that ‘Alpion’s examination of Mother Teresa’s celebrity is a case study of corporate identity management in today’s global media environment. His weaving of primary texts into the setting of this character piece creates a comprehensive cross-cultural examination that has the potential to become a new archetypal work of this mercurial personality.’ 

.

Personal life 
Alpion is married  and has two children.

Main Publications

Academic 
Alpion's main publications to date include: Mother Teresa: Saint or Celebrity?  (London and New York: Routledge, 2007; New Delhi: Routledge India, 2008; Rome: Salerno Editrice, 2008), Foreigner Complex: Essays and Fiction about Egypt (2002), and Encounters with Civilizations: From Alexander the Great to Mother Teresa, which was published in India, the US, and the UK in 2008, 2009, 2011 & 2017. 

Some of the peer-reviewed journals that have published Alpion's article and reviews include: International Journal of Public Theology, Studies in Religion/Sciences Religieuses Journal, Continuum: Journal of Media & Cultural Studies, The Journal of the Royal Anthropological Institute, Journal of Southern Europe and the Balkans (currently known as Journal of Balkan and Near Eastern Studies), Islam and Christian-Muslim Relations Journal, The Review of Communication Journal, Film & History: An Interdisciplinary Journal of Film and Television Studies and Scope: An Online Journal of Film and Television Studies.

Playwright 
Alpion is also a playwright; his plays Vouchers (2001) and If Only the Dead Could Listen  (2008) address the treatment of refugees and asylum seekers in the West. Sponsored by Arts Council England, the plays have been successfully performed across the UK.

Journalism 
Alpion has written features on British, Balkan, Middle Eastern and Indian politics, culture and identity for The Guardian, Hindustan Times, The Middle East Times, The Birmingham Post, The Huddersfield Daily Examiner, The Hürriyet Daily News, and The Conversation (website).

Civil Society Activist

Construction of the Arbëri Road 
On 18 March 2013, Alpion began an online petition for the Albanian government that emerged after the June 2013 general election, to complete the construction of the Arbëri Road, a highway linking Albania's capital Tirana with his native Dibra, one of the most impoverished and neglected regions in Albania. Access from Tirana to Dibra currently takes around six hours along a 180 km poorly maintained road. The proposed highway will ensure an entire journey of less than two hours and be just 72 km long. Furthermore, the highway will have another leg linking Dibra with Skopje, the capital of Macedonia, thus becoming a crucial part of the Balkan infrastructure. It will also ensure Macedonia, Kosovo and Bulgaria gain unprecedented access to the Adriatic Sea, contributing further to the EU integration of this area of the Balkans. In May 2014 Alpion was received by the President of Albania, Bujar Nishani, the Speaker of Parliament, Ilir Meta, and the Minister of Transport and Infrastructure, Edmond Haxhinasto, and hosted a roundtable discussion in Tirana with a number of Albanian MPs where they discussed the Arbëri Road. To date the petition, which has been covered widely by the Albania media in the Balkans and diaspora as well as the British, Indian, and Slovakian media outlets, has over 20,000 signatories, consisting of 18,000 submitted online and 2,000 on paper. The Albanian Prime Minister Edi Rama has yet to agree to receive the petition in person. The Albanian government allocated $110,000 towards a feasibility study in 2004 and the road was approved a year later. The road has been one of the main election promises for all major political parties since 2004 which once in power, have subsequently shelved it.
During his visit to Macedonia in September 2015 Alpion had a meeting with Ali Ahmeti, leader of the Democratic Union for Integration and a junior coalition partner in the Macedonian government since 2008. Among the issues discussed at the meeting were the construction of the Arbëri Road in the territory of Macedonia, and the future of the Radika River, a contentious issue in this country.

Canonization of Mother Teresa 
In 2014, Alpion led an online campaign for the canonization of Mother Teresa, with an online petition of over 1500 signatures. Mother Teresa was canonized in 2016.

Books 
 Alpion, G., Encounters with Civilizations: From Alexander the Great to Mother Teresa, New Brunswick and London: Transaction Publishers, 2011. 
 Alpion, G., Mother Teresa: Saint or Celebrity? London and New York: Routledge, 2007 (simultaneously published in the UK, the US and Canada); Indian Edition (in English), New Delhi: Routledge India, 2008; Italian Edition (in Italian), Rome, 2008.
 Alpion, G., If Only the Dead Could Listen, Chapel Hill, NC, USA: Globic Press, 2008. 
 Alpion, G., Foreigner Complex: Essays and Fiction about Egypt, Birmingham, UK: University of Birmingham CPS, 2002.
 Alpion, G., Vouchers: A Tragedy, Birmingham, UK: University of Birmingham CPS, 2001.

References

External links 
Arnot, Chris. 'Sinners and winners'. The Guardian, 1 November 2005.
Lipsett, Anthea. 'Gëzim Alpion: Speaking for the refugee in us all'. Times Higher Education, 3 February 2006.
Spink, Kathryn. 'Baffled by enigma of sancity'. The Tablet, 6 January 2007.
Derbyshire, Stuart. 'Mother Teresa and the ‘me, me, me’ culture'. Spiked Magazine, 14 February 2007.
Neuhaus, Richard John. 'T. S. Eliot, Mother Teresa, and the Children of Darkness'. First Things: The Journal of Religion, Culture and Public Life, New York, 23 February 2007.
Liaugminas, Sheila. 'Trashing the icon of altruism'. MercatorNet, 27 February 2007.
Byrne, Lavinia. 'Famous by her own design'. Church Times, London, 3 April 2007.
Schwartz, Stephen 'Review of Mother Teresa: Saint or Celebrity?'. Illyria, New York, 19 September 2007.

20th-century Albanian philosophers
21st-century Albanian philosophers
Albanian academics
Living people
University of Tirana alumni
Cairo University alumni
Alumni of Durham University
Academics of the University of Birmingham
Albanian dramatists and playwrights
People associated with York St John University
People from Peshkopi
Albanian expatriates in the United Kingdom
Year of birth missing (living people)